Halogen Group Nigeria formally known as Halogen Security Company is the first indigenous private security company in Nigeria founded by Biodun Shobanjo in July 1992.

History 
Halogen Group started in Ikeja, Lagos State, Nigeria and is registered as a private limited liability company as Halogen Security Company Limited with only 20 men. They provide security risk solutions to enterprise and individuals. The company has grown to become West Africa's leading private security solution market by creating sustainable safety across West Africa.

Services 
They provide solutions to risk management, national infrastructure protective services, electronic and cyber security. They have also established a training institute for manpower development.

In 2019, the company launched 6 sub companies to provide security solutions using technology in Nigeria and West Africa.

Awards 
The company has received awards across Nigeria and Africa. Some include the Nigeria Advancement Award and Best Private Security Company.

References 

Security companies
Private security industry